is a Japanese footballer, playing as a central midfielder.

He was educated at and played for Kagoshima Technical High School.

As part of the football development program with JAPAN Soccer College, he played for Albirex Niigata FC (Singapore) from the S.League in 2013.

He was named as one of the players retained for the 2014 S.League season on December 3, 2013 and will continue to wear the squad number 16.

Club career statistics

References

External links
 Hiroki Morisaki renews contract
 Player Profile on Albirex Niigata FC (S) Official Website

1991 births
Living people
Japanese footballers
Singapore Premier League players
Japan Soccer College players
Albirex Niigata Singapore FC players
Association football forwards